David John Tierney (born 21 October 1979) is an Irish sportsperson. He plays hurling with his local club Kilnadeema–Leitrim and with the Galway senior inter-county hurling team.

Gaelic football
He also had a brief stint with the Galway football squad in 2000 and played his club football with St Grellan's.

He began playing Gaelic football for Salthill-Knocknacarra in 2012, when he won a County final against Tuam Stars.

References
 David Tierney on Hurlingstats.com
 Galway GAA honours

1980 births
Living people
Dual players
Kilnadeema-Leitrim hurlers
Galway inter-county hurlers
Connacht inter-provincial hurlers
Ballinasloe Gaelic footballers
Salthill-Knocknacarra Gaelic footballers
Galway inter-county Gaelic footballers